Oymyakonsky District (Öymököön uluuha) is an administrative and municipal district (raion, or ulus), one of the thirty-four in the Sakha Republic, Russia. It is located in the east of the republic and borders with Ust-Maysky District in the southwest, Tomponsky District in the west, Momsky District in the north, Susumansky District of Magadan Oblast in the east, and with Okhotsky District of Khabarovsk Krai in the south. Its administrative center is the urban locality (a settlement) of Ust-Nera. Population:  14,670 (2002 Census);  The population of Ust-Nera accounts for 63.9% of the district's total population.

Geography

The landscape of the district is mostly mountainous. The Nera Plateau is located in the eastern part of the district, the Tas-Kystabyt Range in the central area, the Oymyakon Highlands and the Elgin Plateau in the west, the Suntar-Khayata Range at the southwestern end and some ranges of the Chersky mountain system in the north. The main river is the Indigirka, with its tributaries Kuydusun and Kyuente, among others. The entire territory of the district is part of the Indigirka River basin. There are many lakes in the district, with Labynkyr Lake in particular being famous for its mythical Labynkyr monster.

Climate
The rural locality of Oymyakon is the Pole of Cold of the northern hemisphere, with the temperature of  having been recorded in February 1933.

History
The district was established on May 20, 1931.

Demographics
From 1989 to 2007, the district's population, mostly represented by Russians (53%), Yakuts (29%), Ukrainians (6%), and Evenks (4%), declined by nearly 55%.

Economy
The economy of the district is based mostly on mining and agriculture. There are deposits of gold, silver, tin, tungsten, lead, zinc, and antimony in the district.

Transportation
The M56 Kolyma Highway runs through the district, connecting it with Yakutsk and Magadan.

Inhabited localities

Divisional source:

*Administrative centers are shown in bold

References

Notes

Sources

Districts of the Sakha Republic